

The LVG D.VI was a prototype German biplane fighter built by LVG in World War I.

Design
The D.VI was a single-seat biplane fighter which featured a slab-sided plywood-covered fuselage as well as an almond-shaped rudder. Unlike the LVG D.V, the D.VI had more conventional wings, the upper wing being larger and having curved tips and ailerons, and the lower wing being smaller and being swept back. The wings were connected by I struts, with wire cross bracing.

Specifications

References

Further reading
 

1910s German fighter aircraft
D 06
Rotary-engined aircraft
Biplanes
Aircraft first flown in 1918